Hypermobility spectrum disorder (HSD), related to earlier diagnoses such as hypermobility syndrome (HMS), and joint hypermobility syndrome (JHS) is a heritable connective tissue disorder that affects joints and ligaments. Different forms and sub-types have been distinguished, but it does not include asymptomatic joint hypermobility, sometimes known as double-jointedness.

Symptoms can include the inability to walk properly or for long distances, and pain in affected areas. Some people with HSD have hypersensitive nerves and a weaker immune system. It can also cause severe fatigue and some cases cause depressive episodes. It is somewhat similar to other genetic connective tissue disorders such as Ehlers–Danlos syndromes.
There is a strong association between HSD and neurodevelopmental disorders such as ADHD (Attention deficit hyperactivity disorder) and ASD (autism spectrum disorder).

Classification
Hypermobility spectrum disorders are diagnosed when individuals have symptomatic joint hypermobility but do not meet the criteria for other connective tissue disorders, such as Ehlers–Danlos syndrome.

The term "hypermobility spectrum disorder" was coined in 2017 after criteria for hypermobile Ehlers–Danlos syndrome were made more restrictive. In part, this classification change was designed to address the overlap between joint hypermobility syndrome and what was then known as Ehlers–Danlos syndrome, hypermobility type (EDS-HT), which some researchers believed were the same condition. While hypermobility spectrum disorders are most analogous to JHS, the 2017 diagnostic criteria for hypermobile Ehlers–Danlos syndrome excludes many people who fit the old criteria, who would instead be diagnosed with hypermobility spectrum disorders.

Hypermobility syndrome and hypermobility spectrum disorders do not include people with asymptomatic hypermobility or people with double-jointedness but no other symptoms. Hypermobile Ehlers–Danlos syndrome and hypermobility spectrum disorders may be equally severe.

Signs and symptoms 
Some common symptoms of hypermobility spectrum disorder include:
 Joint pain (pain can arise in every joint)
 Exhaustion (typically when affected area is the legs);
 Swelling around the joint when joint is being exerted;
 Depression;
 Weaker immune system;
 Muscle pain 
 Varying pain levels around the affected areas. 
 Muscle spasms.
Other symptoms can appear and not everyone affected experiences the same symptoms.

Diagnosis 

Being diagnosed with hypermobility syndrome can be a difficult task. There is a lack of wide understanding of the condition and it can be considered a zebra condition. As hypermobility syndrome can be easily mistaken for being double-jointed or categorised as nothing more than perhaps an achy body from lack of exercise, medical professionals may diagnose those affected incorrectly and not adequately investigate the symptoms. Due to these circumstances many affected individuals can live not knowing they have it. As a result, those affected without a proper diagnosis can easily injure themselves and not take proper care to ensure they go about working safely.

The Beighton Score can be used to determine generalised joint hypermobility (GJH) related to hypermobility syndrome. The newer term "generalised hypermobility spectrum disorder" includes people with generalised joint hypermobility, often determined using the Beighton Score, and other symptoms. Those who do not meet the Beighton Score criteria may be diagnosed with historical joint hypermobility spectrum disorder, peripheral hypermobility spectrum disorder, or localised hypermobility spectrum disorder.

In comparison to the diagnostic criteria of hypermobile Ehlers–Danlos syndrome, the criteria for hypermobile spectrum disorder are less strict. However, these criteria are differentiated from criteria of other EDS types and therefore its less-strict criteria are only comparable to the criteria of hEDS. As those with HSD experience a considerable amount of discomfort, it is important to focus on the treatment, not the labels. The severity of each condition can be equivalent. In particular, musculoskeletal involvement is a requirement for diagnosis with any form of hypermobility spectrum disorder but not for hypermobile Ehlers–Danlos syndrome. Like hypermobile Ehlers–Danlos syndrome, hypermobility spectrum disorders are associated with orthostatic tachycardia, gastrointestinal disorders, and pelvic and bladder dysfunction.

Treatment 
Treating hypermobility syndrome can be difficult. The condition has no direct cure, but its symptoms can be treated. Physiotherapy, particularly exercise, is the main treatment for the condition, although there is only limited evidence for its effectiveness.

Treatments for pain include:
 Bandaging the affected area;
 Placing an ice pack on the affected area;
 Taking over the counter pain killers such as paracetamol or ibuprofen.

Prevalence
Prevalence of the condition is unknown, but can be high in those attending musculoskeletal services.

References

Syndromes affecting joints